Margaret Gipsy Moth (January 30, 1951– March 21, 2010) was a photojournalist who worked for CNN.

Early life
Born in Gisborne, New Zealand, as Margaret Wilson, she got her first camera at age 8.

She was the first news camerawoman in New Zealand, originally for the local DNTV2 station in the South Island before working for the national TVNZ channel.

She changed her name to Margaret Gipsy Moth reportedly because of her love for parachuting from Tiger Moth airplanes and her desire to have her "own" name.

Career 
Moth moved to the United States and worked for KHOU in Houston, Texas, for about seven years before moving to CNN in 1990.

Moth covered the Persian Gulf War, the rioting that followed Indira Gandhi's assassination, the civil war in Tbilisi, Georgia, and the Bosnian War. She had been described by colleagues as quirky, tough, fearless and funny.

In July 1992, Moth was shot and severely wounded while filming in Sniper Alley in Sarajevo. Because of this injury, considerable damage was done to her body, and her speech became slurred. Despite her injuries, she returned to work in Sarajevo six months later, joking that she was going back to look for her missing teeth.

In 1992, Moth won a Courage in Journalism Award from the International Women's Media Foundation (IWMF).

She was the subject of the CNN documentary Fearless: the Margaret Moth Story, which aired in October 2009.  It was the story of her reporting the news in dangerous war zones, without fear. In the documentary, she was quoted as saying, "I've gotten everything out of life."

Final years
In 2007, Moth was diagnosed with colon cancer. Two years later, she told a CNN documentary crew, "I would have liked to think I'd have gone out with a bit more flair ...  the important thing is to know that you've lived your life to the fullest.... You could be a billionaire, and you couldn't pay to do the things we've done."

In early September 2009, she entered a hospice in Rochester, Minnesota, where she died on March 21, 2010, at the age of 59.

References

1951 births
2010 deaths
Deaths from cancer in Minnesota
Deaths from colorectal cancer
People from Gisborne, New Zealand
New Zealand photojournalists
New Zealand women photographers
Women photojournalists